John Myles may refer to:

John Myles (MP), English MP for Coventry from 1593 to 1597
John Myles (minister) (c. 1621–1683), Colonial American founder of Swansea, Massachusetts
John Myles (Australian politician) (1813–1893), politician in colonial Victoria, Australia

See also
John Miles (disambiguation)
John Mylles (c. 1604–1676), English MP for Oxford University
John Myles-Mills (born 1966), Ghanaian athlete 
Jonathan Myles-Lea (born 1969), English painter of historic houses
Jonathan Myles (born 1982), American Olympic luger